is a railway station on the Oga Line in the city of Oga, Akita Prefecture, Japan, operated by East Japan Railway Company (JR East).

Lines

Station layout
The station has one island platform, connected to the station building by a level crossing. The station is unattended.

Platforms

History

Wakimoto Station opened on November 8, 1914, as a station on the Japanese Government Railways (JGR) serving the village of Wakimoto. JGR became JNR (Japanese National Railways) after World War II. With the privatization of JNR on April 1, 1987, the station came under the control of JR East. It has been unattended since April 2011.

Passenger statistics
In fiscal 2009, the station was used by an average of 205 passengers daily (boarding passengers only). The passenger figures for previous years are as shown below.

Surrounding area
 
 Wakimoto Post Office
 Wakimoto No. 1 Elementary School

See also
 List of railway stations in Japan

References

External links

  

Railway stations in Akita Prefecture
Oga Line
Railway stations in Japan opened in 1914
Stations of East Japan Railway Company
Oga, Akita